Carlos Alberto Flores Ascencio (born 10 August 1978) is a Peruvian footballer who plays as a centre back. He plays for Cobresol in the Torneo Descentralizado.

Club career
Flores started his career with Deportivo Pesquero in 1999. That season he made his top-flight debut in the Torneo Descentralizado.

Later in 2003 he had spell with Estudiantes de Medicina in the 2003 season. There he played alongside his brother Juan "Chiquito" Flores.

Then in 2006 he played in the Copa Perú division with Deportivo Ingeniería and then the next season with Tarapacá de Huánuco.

The following seasons he would have spells with Sport Águila and Sport Huancayo. In his last spell with Huancayo he returned to the Descentralizado in the 2010 season, making 19 appearances and scoring 1 goal.

References

1978 births
Living people
Peruvian footballers
Peruvian Primera División players
Deportivo Pesquero footballers
Estudiantes de Medicina footballers
Sport Huancayo footballers
Cobresol FBC footballers
Association football defenders